List of European Britons
 List of Cypriot Britons
 List of Dutch Britons
 List of German Britons
 List of Greek Britons
 List of Italian Britons
 List of Spanish Britons
 List of Black Britons
 List of Barbadian Britons
 List of Ghanaian Britons
 List of Guyanese Britons
 List of Jamaican Britons
 List of Nigerian Britons
 List of Trinidadian Britons
 List of South Asian Britons
List of Bangladeshi Britons
 List of Indian Britons
 List of Sikh Britons
 List of Pakistani Britons
List of Punjabi Britons
List of Sri Lankan Britons
 List of Other Asian Britons
List of British Azerbaijanis
 List of Chinese Britons
 List of Filipino Britons
 List of Iranian Britons
 List of Iraqi Britons
 List of Turkish Britons
 List of British Vietnamese
 List of Latin Americans in the United Kingdom
 List of Brazilian Britons
 List of Mexican Britons

Ethnic or national origin